The 2017–18 Xavier Musketeers men's basketball team represented Xavier University during the 2017–18 NCAA Division I men's basketball season as a member of the Big East Conference. Led by ninth-year head coach Chris Mack, they played their home games at the Cintas Center in Cincinnati, Ohio. They finished the season 29–6, 15–3 in Big East play to win the Big East championship. In the Big East tournament, they defeated St. John's before losing to Providence in the semifinals. They received an at-large bid to the NCAA tournament as a No. 1 seed in the West region. In the First Round, they defeated Texas Southern before being upset by Florida State in the Second Round.

On March 27, 2018, Chris Mack was hired as the new head coach of Louisville, leaving Xavier after nine seasons. Four days later, longtime assistant coach Travis Steele was named the new head coach of the Musketeers.

Previous season
The Musketeers finished the 2016–17 season 24–14, 9–9 in Big East play to finish in seventh place. In the Big East tournament, they defeated DePaul and Butler before losing to Creighton in the semifinals. They received an at-large bid to the NCAA tournament as a No. 11 seed in the West region where they defeated Maryland, Florida State, and Arizona before losing in the Elite Eight to Gonzaga.

Offseason

Returning players
On March 31, 2017, Trevon Bluiett announced he would declare for the NBA draft, but would not hire an agent. On May 23, he withdrew his name from the draft and announced he would return to Xavier for his senior season.

Incoming recruits

Incoming transfers

Future recruits

2018 recruits

Preseason 
In its annual preseason preview, Blue Ribbon Yearbook ranked the Musketeers No. 21 in the country. Trevon Bluiett was named a third team All-American.

In a poll of Big East coaches at the conference's media day, the Musketeers were picked to finish in third place in the Big East. Senior guard Trevon Bluiett was named to the preseason All-Big East First team while senior guard J.P. Macura was named a preseason All-Big East Honorable Mention.

Roster

Schedule and results

|-
!colspan=9 style=""| Exhibition

|-
!colspan=9 style=""| Non-conference regular season

|-
!colspan=9 style=""|Big East regular season

|-
!colspan=9 style=""|Big East tournament

|-
!colspan=9 style=""|NCAA tournament

Rankings

AP does not release post-NCAA tournament rankings

References

Xavier Musketeers men's basketball seasons
Xavier
Xavier